CHED (630 AM) is a radio station licensed to Edmonton, Alberta. Owned by Corus Entertainment, it broadcasts a news/talk format, and first signed on in 1954. Its studios are located on 84th Street in Edmonton, while its transmitters are located in Southeast Edmonton.

CHED is the flagship station of the Edmonton Oilers of the National Hockey League, and broadcasts Oilers Now, a daily talk show hosted by the team's radio colour analyst Bob Stauffer. The current agreement between the two parties extends through the 2022–23 NHL season.

History
Originally owned by Hugh Sibbald, LLoyd Moffat, and E. A. Rawlinson, the station first signed on to 1080 kHz at 8:00 p.m. on March 3, 1954, from studios on the corner of 107 Street and 100 Avenue in Downtown Edmonton. On May 14, 1963, at 6:30 am, CHED switched to its current frequency of 630 kHz. Beginning in 1959, CHED aired a Top 40/CHR format.

Jerry Forbes ran the first 630 CHED Santas Anonymous in 1955. The charity provided 600 toys to children in its first year and is still run annually as of 2020. In the latest edition, the toy drive provided toys to over 20,000 children.

In 1970, Bob Layton joined the station as a writer for Frank Robertson. The following year after Frank left the station, Bob went on the air as his replacement, beginning a near 50-year career in broadcasting. He would go on to win several national awards for his radio editorials.

According to the 1976 B.B.M. Weekly Reach survey, CHED was the most-listened-to radio station in Edmonton. This marked a period in which the Top-40 format lead CHED to become "thee" radio station in the region. This continued until FM frequencies began pulling listeners away and on December 1, 1993, the station relaunched with a news/talk format.

On July 6, 2000, Corus Entertainment Inc. acquired the broadcast license for CHED from WIC Radio.

Throughout the 2010s, CHED was consistently in the top 3 of the most-listened-to radio stations in the Edmonton market, with a listener share reaching as high as 11.5 in 2016.

As of February 28, 2021, CHED is the 4th-most-listened-to radio station in the Edmonton market according to a PPM data report released by Numeris.

Programming

Current 
CHED has been operating a news/talk/sports format since 1993. The weekday morning schedule leads with the 630 CHED Morning Show hosted by Chelsea Bird. Former hosts at this station include Ryan Jespersen, who was fired in September 2020 after comments he made regarding a city councillor's staff. 630 CHED Afternoons is the other daily news/talk program featured on the station.

On April 12, 2021, the station launched a new province wide talk show along with CHQR in Calgary featuring former CHED Morning Show host Shaye Ganam.

Sports programs on the station include Oilers Now with Bob Stauffer and Inside Sports with Reid Wilkins. CHED has also broadcast all Edmonton Oilers games since 1995.

Conservative radio host Charles Adler is syndicated on CHED each weeknight. His program Charles Adler Tonight has been running since 2016.

During off peak time and on weekends, the station features several local and syndicated programs. These include The Garden Show, Money Talks, The Shift, and Couch Potatoes.

References

External links
630 CHED

Hed
Hed
Hed
Radio stations established in 1954
1954 establishments in Alberta